Restigouche—Madawaska was a federal electoral district in New Brunswick, Canada, that was represented in the House of Commons of Canada from 1917 to 1968.

This riding was created in 1914 from parts of Restigouche and Victoria ridings.

With the 1966 redistribution, Madawaska County was moved to the new Madawaska—Victoria riding, while Restigouche County  became the district of Restigouche.

Members of Parliament

This riding elected the following Members of Parliament:

Election results 

|-

|-
|bgcolor="EEBBBB"|
|Farmer-Labour
|John Lewis Gordon Annett
|align="right"|2,117
|align="right"|10.8
|align="right"|*

See also 

 List of Canadian federal electoral districts
 Past Canadian electoral districts

External links 
 Website of the Parliament of Canada
 Riding History from the Library of Parliament

Former federal electoral districts of New Brunswick